The C# programming language provides many classes and methods to perform file and stream input and output.

The most common stream classes used for file and stream I/O within the .NET Framework are listed below:

References
 

C Sharp programming language family